was a  cargo ship that was laid down 6 December, 1941 as Empire Dragon by Hong Kong & Whampoa Dock Co Ltd, Hong Kong for the Ministry of War Transport (MoWT).

Description
The ship was laid down in 1941 by Hong Kong & Whampoa Dock Co Ltd, Hong Kong.

The ship was propelled by a triple expansion steam engine.

History
Empire Dragon was laid down on 6 December 1941. On 26 December, 1941, she was seized by the Japanese in an incomplete state and completed as Gyōkū Maru in August, 1943. and placed in IJA service.

On 22 August 1944, she was part of Convoy Namo 103 carrying evacuating civilians from Okinawa and attacked by USS Bowfin. The fellow ship Tsushima Maru was sunk, but Gyōkū Maru escaped.

References

1941 ships
Ships built in Hong Kong
Empire ships
Ministry of War Transport ships
World War II merchant ships of Japan
Steamships of Japan
Ships sunk by American submarines
World War II shipwrecks in the East China Sea
Maritime incidents in December 1941
Maritime incidents in September 1944
Ships built by the Hong Kong & Whampoa Dock Company